Tom Chadbon (born 27 February 1946, in Luton) is an English actor who has spent much of his career appearing on British television. Although principally a character actor, he has occasionally had leading or recurring roles.

Chadbon starred in all 10 episodes of Crown Prosecutor (1995), playing Lenny Monk, and he had substantial recurring roles in Chancer, The Liver Birds, Where the Heart Is, Wire in the Blood, and the 23rd series of Casualty (as Professor Henry Williams).

Chadbon is also recognisable from his featured appearances on many British television shows, including: Out of the Unknown, The Stone Tape, Softly, Softly, Blake's 7, Special Branch, Tales of the Unexpected, Sherlock Holmes and the Leading Lady, The New Statesman, Between the Lines, Peak Practice, Casualty, Hetty Wainthropp Investigates, Silent Witness, The Bill, Holby City, Heartbeat, Foyle's War, Midsomer Murders, Rebecca, Taggart, Peep Show, and Father Brown.
   
He played Duggan in the Doctor Who serial City of Death (1979) and returned to Doctor Who as Merdeen in the 1986 serial The Trial of a Time Lord. Chadbon has also been an occasional guest star in Big Finish audio productions.  Most notably, he played the recurring character of Will in the second series of the Sarah Jane Smith audio adventures. He also had a featured guest role in No More Lies, during Paul McGann's 2007 broadcast season on BBC Radio 7. He also reprised the role of Del Grant for the Blake's 7 audio series for Big Finish.

Chadbon's film work includes The Alf Garnett Saga (1972), The Beast Must Die (1974), Juggernaut (1974), Tess (1979), Coming Out of the Ice (1982), Dance with a Stranger (1985), Shooting Fish (1997), and Casino Royale (2006).

Selected filmography
The Alf Garnett Saga (1972) – Jim
The Beast Must Die (1974) – Paul Foote
Juggernaut (1974) – Juggernaut's Contact
Electric Eskimo (1979)
Tess (1979) – Cuthbert Clare
Coming Out of the Ice (1982) – Samsonov
Dance with a Stranger (1985) – Anthony Findlater
Shooting Fish (1997) – Mr. Greenaway
Dragons: A Fantasy Made Real (2004) - Museum Curator
Casino Royale (2006) – Stockbroker
Game of Thrones, "The Dragon and the Wolf" (2017)

External links
 

1946 births
Male actors from Bedfordshire
English male television actors
Living people
People from Luton
20th-century English male actors
21st-century English male actors